Thaumatodryinus tuukkaraski is a wasp species in the family Dryinidae. This tiny insect is endemic to Kenya where it is only known from the Taita Hills. In 2015, this newly discovered species was named in direct reference to former Boston Bruins (NHL) goaltender, Tuukka Rask.

Etymology
The specific name tuukkaraski is in direct reference to the Boston Bruins (NHL) goaltender, Tuukka Rask. The reasoning given by the authors was that "[t]his species is named after the acrobatic goaltender for the Finnish National ice hockey team and the Boston Bruins, whose glove hand is as tenacious as the raptorial fore tarsus of this dryinid species”.

Distribution and ecology
Its ecology, including the host species, is otherwise unknown.

Description
The species description is based on a single female, the holotype, now stored in the collections of the National Museums of Kenya. The first pair of legs have enlarged claws referred to in the naming of this species. The occipital carina is incomplete. The antennae are clavate. The wings are fully developed; the forewings have a transverse band whereas the hindwings are hyaline. The body is mostly black, with some testaceous or brown parts. The legs are testaceous-whitish except for the clubs of femora that are brown.

References

Dryinidae
Insects of Kenya
Endemic fauna of Kenya
Insects described in 2015